Year 1003 (MIII) was a common year starting on Friday (link will display the full calendar) of the Julian calendar.

Events 
 By place 

 Europe 
 February 9 – Boleslaus III is restored to authority with armed support from Duke Bolesław I (the Brave) of Poland. The following months, Boleslaus' brothers Jaromír and Oldřich flee to Germany and place themselves under the protection of King Henry II, while Boleslaus orders the massacre of his Bohemian leading nobles at Vyšehrad.
 German–Polish War: Bolesław I annexes Bohemia and parts of Moravia (modern Slovakia). German nobles under Henry of Schweinfurt revolt against Henry II (who has been promised the Duchy of Bavaria).
 Count Oliba (Taillefer) Ripoll. Oliba takes up the Benedictine habit at the Monastery of Santa Maria de Ripoll.
 King Robert II (the Pious) invades Burgundy, but fails. After this fiasco Robert repudiates his second wife, Bertha of Burgundy, and marries Constance of Arles who becomes queen consort of France.
 King Rudolph III of Burgundy invests Humbert I (the White-Handed) with the domains of the Duchy of Aosta. He becomes the first count of the House of Savoy.
 King Stephen I of Hungary invades Transylvania (modern Romania) and establishes the Diocese of Transylvania (approximate date).
 Battle of Albesa: Muslim forces of the Caliphate of Cordoba defeat the northern Christian armies of León, Pamplona and Castile.

 England 
 King Sweyn I (Forkbeard) lands with a Danish Viking fleet in East Anglia, ravaging the countryside. Northumbria surrenders to him (approximate date).

 Asia 
 Emperor Sheng Zong of the Khitan-led Liao Dynasty leads an expedition into Mongolia and subdues the Zubu tribe who are forced to pay an annual tribute.

 By topic 

 Art 
 Construction of the Brihadisvara Temple in Tamil Nadu (modern India), during the Chola Dynasty (Early Medieval period).

 Religion 
 May 12 – Pope Sylvester II dies after a 4-year pontificate. He is succeeded by John XVII as the 140th pope of the Catholic Church.
 November 6 – John XVII dies after a pontificate of about 7 months and is buried in the Lateran Basilica at Rome.
 Heribert, archbishop of Cologne, founds Deutz Abbey at Deutz (Germany).

Births 
 Amatus, bishop of Nusco (approximate date)
 Conrad II (the Younger), duke of Carinthia (d. 1039)
 Edward the Confessor, king of England (d. 1066)
 Frederick, duke of Lower Lorraine (approximate date) 
 Hedwig (or Advisa), French princess (approximate date)
 Herleva, Norman noblewoman (approximate date)
 Ibn Hayyus, Syrian poet and panegyrist (d. 1081)
 Ibn Zaydún, Andalusian poet and writer (d. 1071)
 Jing Zong, Chinese emperor of Western Xia (d. 1048)
 Liudolf of Brunswick, margrave of Frisia (d. 1038)
 Musharrif al-Dawla, Buyid emir of Iraq (d. 1025)

Deaths 
 January 19 – Kilian of Cologne, Irish abbot
 January 25 – Lothair I, margrave of the Nordmark
 May 4 – Herman II, duke of Swabia (Germany)
 May 12 – Sylvester II, pope of the Catholic Church
 July 11 – Al-Mansur al-Qasim al-Iyyani, Zaidi imam
 August 3 – At-Ta'i, Abbasid caliph of Baghdad (b. 929)
 November 6 – John XVII, pope of the Catholic Church
 December 24 – William II, German nobleman
 December 27 – Emma of Blois, duchess of Aquitaine
 Athanasius the Athonite, Byzantine monk (b. 920)
 Brian mac Maelruanaidh, king of Maigh Seóla (Ireland)
 Didda, queen consort and regent of Kashmir (India)
 Erik the Red, Norse Viking explorer (approximate date)
 Flannchad ua Ruaidíne, abbot of Clonmacnoise
 Gregory of Narek, Armenian theologian (b. 951)
 Gurgen IV, king of Vaspurakan (Armenia)
 Ibrahim ibn Baks, Buyid scholar and physician
 Philotheos, patriarch of Alexandria (Egypt)
 Rozala, French queen and countess of Flanders
 Vladivoj, duke of Bohemia (Czech Republic)

References